Drummond–Bois-Francs is a provincial electoral district in the Centre-du-Québec region of Quebec, Canada, that elects members to the National Assembly of Quebec. It notably includes parts of the city of Drummondville as well as Saint-Cyrille-de-Wendover, Warwick, Kingsey Falls and Saint-Lucien

It was created for the 2012 election from parts of the former Drummond and Richmond electoral districts.

Members of the National Assembly

Election results

^ Change is from redistributed results; CAQ change is from ADQ

References

External links
Information
 Elections Quebec

Maps
 2011 map (PDF)
2001–2011 changes to Drummond (Flash)
2001–2011 changes to Richmond (Flash)
 Electoral map of Centre-du-Québec region
 Quebec electoral map, 2011

Drummondville
Quebec provincial electoral districts